Wilma Yanet Arizapana Yucra (born October 1, 1982 in Chupa, Puno) is a Peruvian long-distance runner. She competed in the marathon at the 2012 Summer Olympics, placing 55th with a time of 2:35:09. She also won the bronze in the 2013 Bolivarian Games.

Personal bests
1500 m: 4:23.20– Cartagena, 5 July 2013
5000 m: 15:55.70 – Trujillo, 28 November 2013
10,000 m: 33:11.97 – Lima, 6 October 2013
Half marathon: 1:12:25 – Lima, 1 September 2013
Marathon: 2:34:11 – Rotterdam, 15 April 2012

Achievements

References

External links

Sports reference biography

1982 births
Living people
Peruvian female marathon runners
Peruvian female long-distance runners
Pan American Games competitors for Peru
Athletes (track and field) at the 2007 Pan American Games
Athletes (track and field) at the 2011 Pan American Games
Olympic athletes of Peru
Athletes (track and field) at the 2012 Summer Olympics
People from Puno Region
South American Games silver medalists for Peru
South American Games medalists in athletics
Competitors at the 2014 South American Games
20th-century Peruvian women
21st-century Peruvian women